The 12479 / 12480 Suryanagri Express is a Superfast train running between the Indian cities of Jodhpur and Bandra Terminus, Mumbai. It initially plied between Jodhpur and Ahmedabad as the 4845/46 Suryanagri Express. In the 2002/03 railway budget its operation was extended to Bandra Terminus, Mumbai for four days a week. Later it became a daily train between Jodhpur and Bandra Terminus and was renumbered to 12479/12480.

It operates as train number 12479 from Jodhpur to Bandra Terminus and as train number 12480 in the reverse direction.

Coaches

The train has standard ICF rakes with a max speed of 110 kmph. The train consists of 24 coaches:

 1 AC First Class
 1 AC I cum AC II Tier
 1 AC II Tier
 4 AC III Tier
 11 Sleeper coaches
 4 General Unreserved
 2 Seating cum Luggage Rake

As with most train services in India, coach composition may be amended at the discretion of Indian Railways depending on demand.

Service

12479 Jodhpur–Bandra Terminus Suryanagri Express covers a distance of 936.8 kilometers in 16 hours 50 mins (55.54 km/hr) and in 17 hours 00 mins as the 12480 Bandra Terminus–Jodhpur Suryanagri Express (55.00 km/hr).

Route & Halts

Rake sharing
RSA with 22481/22482 Jodhpur–Delhi Sarai Rohilla Superfast Express

Traction

Prior to the Western Railway switching to the AC traction, the 12479/12480 Suryanagri Express would be hauled by a WCAM-1 or WCAM-2/2P engine of Valsad shed from Bandra Terminus up to  after which it would get a WDP-4 from the Bhagat Ki Kothi shed until Jodhpur.

Since the Western Railway switched over to AC traction in February 2012 and the entire route is fully electrified, the 12479/12480 Suryanagri Express is now hauled by a WAP-5 / WAP-4E / WAP-7 from the Vadodara shed from end to end.

Image gallery

References

Transport in Mumbai
Express trains in India
Named passenger trains of India
Rail transport in Gujarat
Rail transport in Maharashtra
Transport in Jodhpur
Railway services introduced in 1998